Cochlicella conoidea is a species of gastropod belonging to the family Geomitridae.

The species is found in Western Europe and Mediterranean.

References

Geomitridae